Castleton railway station serves Castleton in the Metropolitan Borough of Rochdale, Greater Manchester, England. It is 8¾ miles (14 km) north of Manchester Victoria on the Caldervale Line operated and managed by Northern.

History
The original station opened in 1839, at Blue Pits on the western side of the Rochdale-Manchester Road bridge. It was originally called Blue Pits for Heywood. The current station opened on 1 November 1875. The Liverpool and Bury Railway from Bolton (extended through from Bolton and beyond in 1848 to join the earlier M&L Heywood branch previously opened in 1841, which was worked by horses) used to join the main line at a triangular junction a short distance south of the station. This was at one time a busy passenger and freight route often used by trains avoiding the busy Manchester area, but was closed to passengers on 5 October 1970.

The station was also part of the Oldham Loop Line on which there were through services to Oldham via Rochdale. This route was closed in 2009 and has now been converted for light rail use by Manchester Metrolink.

Services
On Monday to Saturday daytimes, there is a half-hourly service in each direction.

On Sundays, the service pattern is hourly between Manchester Victoria - Castleton - Rochdale - Todmorden - Burnley - Accrington and Blackburn.

Facilities
The station is not staffed, but a ticket machine is available. Shelters and passenger information screens are located on each platform and both have step-free access from the street (there are also staircases from Manchester Road bridge to both platforms).

East Lancashire Railway future
The eastern portion of this line was retained for freight traffic after passenger trains ceased (serving the coal depot at Rawtenstall until 1980, and subsequently to the Powell Duffryn wagon works) and it now forms the link with the East Lancashire Railway heritage route at Heywood.  The heritage line plans to extend its services along and towards a possible new bay platform adjacent to the main station in the future, subject to permission being granted by Network Rail.

The bay platform (named Castleton Village) will be adjacent to the main station at Castleton, from where passengers could alight and change station sides directly to Northern Rail services on the national network. Rochdale Council commissioned a study by transport consultants Mouchel in conjunction with the ELR regarding the proposals in 2010; their report which covers the tourism and regeneration aspects of any such future development can be downloaded from the ELR website.

Notes

References
The Manchester and Leeds Railway by Martin Bairstow (1983),
Forgotten Railways: North-West England by John Marshall (1981), David & Charles (Publishers) Ltd, Newton Abbott.

External links

The Castleton and Heywood Masterplan 2010 Moucel report on potential ELR extension through to Castleton station.

Railway stations in the Metropolitan Borough of Rochdale
DfT Category F1 stations
Former Lancashire and Yorkshire Railway stations
Northern franchise railway stations
Railway stations in Great Britain opened in 1875